The Northrop C-19 Alpha was a series of three aircraft purchased from Northrop by the US Army Air Corps in 1931. They were slightly modified versions of the civil Northrop Alpha Type 2.

Design and development
The YC-19 aircraft were Northrop Alpha 4s supplied for evaluation to the USAAC. No production orders were given. The major difference between the C-19s and the Alphas was that the civilian version carried a pilot and six passengers while the Army version carried a pilot and four passengers.

Operational history
One aircraft, the last of the three purchased, crashed between Richmond and Petersburg, Virginia on Sunday, March 19, 1933, killing its pilot and two passengers. The other aircraft were used for several more years until being sent to training schools as subjects for maintenance and repair classes.

Variants
YC-19 one aircraft, previously an Alpha 4, serial number 31-516
Y1C-19 two aircraft, serial numbers 31-517 to 31-518, Pratt & Whitney R-1340-11 engine

Operators
: US Army Air Corps

Specifications (Alpha landplane)

See also

References

C-19 Alpha
Northrop C-019 Alpha
Single-engined tractor aircraft
Low-wing aircraft
Aircraft first flown in 1930